Osthol, or osthole, is a chemical compound which is a derivative of coumarin. It is found in a variety of plants including Cnidium monnieri, Angelica archangelica and Angelica pubescens.

References 

Coumarins